Kaijūsen-ji is a Buddhist temple in Kizugawa, Kyoto Prefecture, Japan. Its five-storied pagoda is a National Treasure of Japan.

References

Buddhist temples in Kyoto Prefecture